The Blackstone Career Institute, based in Allentown, Pennsylvania, and founded in 1890, offers distance education programs and home study programs, specializing in courses students can use to study at home or take online to advance their careers. Training includes courses that prepare a student for a career as a paralegal/legal Assistant, pharmacy technician, medical transcription, medical billing and coding, medical office assistant, dental office assistant, physical therapy aide, veterinary assistant and child care provider.

The Institute was preceded by the Blackstone College of Law (or Blackstone School of Law), an unaccredited correspondence law school in operation until the 1970s. In 1948, the Federal Trade Commission ordered Blackstone to cease misrepresenting its qualifications as a law school, and characterized the institution as a "diploma mill".

History 

In 1890, students with a desire to study law were confronted with many difficulties. Most textbooks were written in a technical style which was difficult to understand. The texts dealt primarily with practice and procedure, while the branches of the law that pertain to business transactions, such as private corporations and partnerships, were not readily accessible for student use.

Around 1912, a group of prominent educators identified with the Chicago-based Blackstone Institute decided to prepare an up-to-date commentary dealing with the modern rules of law and their origin, nature, and growth. Eugene A. Gilmore, at the time Professor of Law at the University of Wisconsin and a member of the Educational Committee of the American Bar Association, was appointed Editor-in-Chief of the new series.

The entire field of law was divided into sixty branches. The best authors for each subject were selected, and the decision was made to leave out as many of the Latin phrases, unnecessary technical matter, and useless citations as possible.

In the late 1970s, the educational component of the Blackstone Institute changed from a School of Law to a legal assistant/paralegal program of study. The Institute moved from Chicago to Dallas and assumed operations under the name Blackstone Paralegal Studies, Inc. Additional study units on legal research, ethics, and employment skills were added so that graduating students could sit for the prestigious Certified Legal Assistant (CLA) exam.

Direct Learning Systems, Inc., a distance education school, purchased the legal assistant/paralegal school from the retiring owner in September 2001. In December of that year, the school was moved to Emmaus, PA, and later relocated in the summer of 2007 to Allentown, PA.

Accreditation and licensing 

The Blackstone Career Institute is privately licensed by the Pennsylvania Department of Education and accredited by the Accrediting Commission of the Distance Education and Training Council (DETC), Washington, D.C., and the Middle States Association of Colleges and Schools. The Blackstone Career Institute is recognized as an accredited school by the U.S. Department of Education.

Academic offerings 

Blackstone Career Institute offers students the opportunity to learn at their own pace in effective, technology-driven programs and services focusing on course quality and student satisfaction. They offer career Diploma Courses, Continuing Education courses and Certificate courses.

References

External links 
	Blackstone Career Institute: http://blackstone.edu 
	Blackstone Paralegal Training and Advanced Law Courses: http://blackstonelaw.com

Distance education institutions based in the United States
Companies based in Allentown, Pennsylvania
Education in Allentown, Pennsylvania